Tufsen is an islet  east of Utsira, part of Thousand Islands, an archipelago south of Edgeøya.

References

 Norwegian Polar Institute Place Names of Svalbard Database

Islands of Svalbard